Sultan Ibrahim may refer to:

 Ibrahim of Ghazna (r. 1059–1099)
 Ibrahim I of the Maldives (r. 1398, 1412–20)
 Ibrahim of the Ottoman Empire (r. 1640–48)
 Sultan Ibrahim of Johor (r. 1895–1959)
 Ibrahim IV of Kelantan (r. 1944–1960)
 Ibrahim Ismail of Johor (born 1958)
 A kind of fish found in the mediterranean sea, also known as threadfin bream